Mr. Canada may refer to:

 Mr. Canada (broadcaster), nickname for Peter Gzowski (1934–2002), Canadian broadcaster, writer and reporter
 Mr. World Canada, a Canadian male beauty pageant

See also
Miss Canada